Catholic Health Services is a ministry of the Roman Catholic Archdiocese of Miami, and the largest post acute provider in the southeast United States.

It originated as Catholic Community Services, and as a result of the work Monsignor Bryan O. Walsh, later became Catholic Health and Rehabilitation Services.

The service operates 26 facilities in Broward and Miami-Dade Counties. According to the 2007 Archdiocese of Miami Official Catholic Directory, the two Catholic hospitals, Mercy Hospital in Miami and Holy Cross Hospital in Ft. Lauderdale, served 1,278,516 people; three CHS health care centers served 7,896; three homes for the aged assisted 2,578 senior citizens; two residential care centers for children served 376; seven day-care centers served 1,885; two specialized homes assisted 383; twelve special centers for social services served 81,320; and eleven other institutions served 1,432 people in 2007. Catholic Hospice Care is a partnership between the Archdiocese of Miami and Mercy Hospital. It provides end of life care to terminally ill patients and their families throughout Miami-Dade and Monroe counties. Catholic Health Services also operates two Catholic cemeteries, Our Lady Queen of Heaven in Broward County and Our Lady of Mercy in Miami-Dade.

References

 

Medical and health organizations based in Florida
Nursing homes in the United States
Roman Catholic Archdiocese of Miami
Catholic health care
Buildings and structures in Miami
Catholic hospital networks in the United States